Trinity railway station served the district of Trinity, Edinburgh, Scotland from 1842 to 1925 on the Edinburgh, Leith and Newhaven Railway.

History 
The station opened on 31 August 1842 by the Edinburgh, Leith and Newhaven Railway. The first site of the station closed on 19 January 1846 when the line to Granton was extended. It was relocated and opened in the same year. On the east side was a coal depot that closed, along with the station on 1 January 1917 because of the First World War. The station opened again on 1 February 1919 but the coal depot didn't reopen. The station closed completely on 2 November 1925.

References

External links 

Disused railway stations in Edinburgh
Railway stations in Great Britain opened in 1842
Railway stations in Great Britain closed in 1917
Railway stations in Great Britain opened in 1919
Railway stations in Great Britain closed in 1925
1842 establishments in Scotland
1925 disestablishments in Scotland
Former North British Railway stations